The Guttenberg State Bank, also known as the People's Bank, is a historic building located in Guttenberg, Iowa, United States.  The bank was incorporated in May 1900 with John P. Eckert was its president.  The bank was also referred to as "Eckert Bank".  They built this building two years later.  It is a two-story brick structure that features a round tower with a conical roof on the corner.  The second floor windows are topped with inlaid brick arches that combines with a brick stringcourse.  Above is a brick cornice.

Guttenberg had two banks, the other was Clayton County State Bank, and neither failed during the Great Depression.  In 1943 the two banks consolidated, and they continued to do business in this facility. The bank expanded to the north in 1979.  The building was individually listed on the National Register of Historic Places in 1984.  In 2004 it was included as a contributing property in the Front Street (River Park Drive) Historic District.

References

Commercial buildings completed in 1902
Romanesque Revival architecture in Iowa
Buildings and structures in Clayton County, Iowa
National Register of Historic Places in Clayton County, Iowa
Bank buildings on the National Register of Historic Places in Iowa
Guttenberg, Iowa
Individually listed contributing properties to historic districts on the National Register in Iowa
1902 establishments in Iowa